Toby Mullarkey (born 4 November 1995) is an English professional footballer who plays for Rochdale, as a defender.

Career
Born in Warrington, Mullarkey began his career at Crewe Alexandra's academy, moving on loan to Leek Town in March 2015. After leaving Crewe without playing a first team match, he played non-league football for Nantwich Town and Altrincham, before signing for Rochdale in January 2023.

Style of play
He has been described as a "modern ball playing centre-back". He "primarily plays as a right-sided centre-half, which remains his favoured position, although has also served as a defensive central midfielder and a right-back on other occasions".

References

1995 births
Living people
English footballers
Crewe Alexandra F.C. players
Leek Town F.C. players
Nantwich Town F.C. players
Altrincham F.C. players
Rochdale A.F.C. players
National League (English football) players
English Football League players
Association football defenders